The 1909 Iowa Hawkeyes football team represented the University of Iowa as a member of the Missouri Valley Conference (MVC) and the Western Conference during the 1909 college football season. Led by John G. Griffith in his first and only season as head coach, the Hawkeyes compiled an overall record of 2–4–1 with a mark of 1–3–1 in MVC play, placing fourth in the MVC. Iowa was 0–1 against Western Conference opponents, finishing seventh in that conference.

Schedule

References

Iowa
Iowa
Iowa Hawkeyes football seasons
Iowa Hawkeyes football